Tamm is a municipality in the district of Ludwigsburg, Baden-Württemberg, Germany.

Tamm may also refer to:
 Tamms, Illinois, a village in Alexander County, Illinois, United States
 Clayton/Tamm, St. Louis, a neighborhood in St. Louis, Missouri, United States
 Tamm (crater), a lunar crater
 Tamm (surname)

See also
 Tamme (disambiguation)